Traxler may refer to:

People
Brian Traxler (1967–2004), American baseball player
J. Bob Traxler (1931-2019), American politician
Jiří Traxler (1912–2011), Czech-Canadian jazz and swing pianist, composer, lyricist and arranger
Karel Traxler (1866–1936), Czech chess player chess-composer and Roman Catholic priest
Margaret Traxler (1924–2002), American Roman Catholic nun and women's rights activist
William Byrd Traxler, Jr. (born 1948), circuit judge and former Chief Judge of the U.S. Court of Appeals for the Fourth Circuit

Places

United States
Traxler, Florida, a ghost town
Thaxler, Mississippi, an unincorporated community

Other
The Traxler Variation, a chess opening